Mr. K may refer to the following:
 Mr. K, a character in Renegade
 Mr. Kobayashi, a character in The Law of Ueki
 Marc Germain, the radio talk host known as Mr. KFI, Mr. KABC, or simply Mr. K
 Yutaka Katayama (1909–2015), Japanese automotive executive; Nissan USA's first president and the "father" of the Nissan Z and Datsun 510
 Mr. K, a fictional character in Go On
 Mr. Nikita Khrushchev (1894–1971), Soviet leader